Turned on is a phrase that describes a person who is sexually aroused.

It may also refer to the following:

Turned On, a music album by Rollins Band
Hot Girls Wanted: Turned On, a 2017 documentary series